This is a list of all aircraft operated by the Australian Army since its formation.

Current

Historic

Unmanned Aerial Vehicles

Fixed Wing Aircraft

Helicopters

List of Guided Missiles of the Australian Army

See also
List of equipment of the Australian Army
List of Australian military equipment of World War II
Historical weaponry of the Australian Army

Notes

References

 
Australian Army aircraft
Aircraft